The Michigan Academy of Science, Arts, and Letters (MASAL) is a regional professional organization of scholars.  Its main activity is the annual meeting (usually March), its quarterly journal of papers (the Michigan Academician), and research news from Michigan universities and colleges.  It also awards annually the Kapp Prize for outstanding undergraduate research presented at its annual meeting.

Most of the MASAL's members are faculty or graduate students at universities or colleges in Michigan.  The remainder are independent scholars, researchers in business or government, or residing in other states.

The Academy is hosted by Alma College.

The Michigan Academician is an interdisciplinary, peer-reviewed journal.  One issue a year is devoted to abstracts of papers presented at the annual meeting.

MASAL is affiliated with the National Association of the Academies of Science of the American Association for the Advancement of Science.

External links
Home Page of the Academy

Professional associations based in the United States